Mohammadi Group of Companies Limited is a Bangladeshi diversified conglomerate based in Dhaka with a focus on the Garments industry. Amin-Ud-Dowla, son of the founder Seraj-Ud-Dowla, is the managing director of Mohammadi Group of Companies Limited. Mir Mosharref Hossain Pakbir is the chairman of the group. Md. Harunur Rashid is a director of Mohammadi Group of Companies Limited.

History 
Mohammadi Group of Companies Limited was established in 1972 by the Seraj-Ud-Dowla.  Annisul Huq served as the managing director and later left the group to establish his own company, Mohammadi Group. Dowla established the Subarna Sari Ghar in Gausia Super Market, Dhaka. He went to established Mohammadi Housing Society and Mohammadi Housing Limited. Mohammadi Housing Society is located in Mohammadpur, Dhaka and is home to 12 thousand residents. The residential area borders the PC Culture Housing Society. 

Seraj-Ud-Dowla, chairman of Mohammadi Group of Companies Limited, established Mohammadi Apparels Limited, one of the first garments factory in Bangladesh after Desh Group established Desh Garments. M/s. Al-Amin Seatrans Ltd sued M/s. Loyal Shipping Pvt, Ltd, owner of M.V, Loyal Bird, after the ship was impounded in Kolkata after being seized in Haldia Port. Seraj-Ud-Dowla was chairman of both companies.

Mohammadi Group established Alamin Sea-Trans Limited, Loyal Shipping Limited, Ben Loyd Shipping Line Limited, and Mohammadi Sea Ways Limited to enter the shipping industry. Seraj-Ud-Dowla was a founding director of Islami Bank Bangladesh Limited. He served as a director of Al-Arafah Islami Bank Limited.

After the death of Seraj-Ud-Dowla in 2011, Mir Mosharref Hossain became chairman of the group. He is a director and writer of The Daily Observer (Bangladesh). He founded Mohammadi News Agency in 1996. He is a sponsor of Bangabandhu Shishu Kishore Mela. He is also the vice-chairman of the Democracy Research Centre. Md. Harunur Rashid is a director of Mohammadi Group of Companies Limited and the chairman of The National H.R. Laboratories Limited.

Businesses 

 Mohammadi News Agency
 Kishore Bangla
 Mohammadi Housing Society 
 Mohammadi Housing Limited
 Mohammadi Apparels Limited
 Alamin Sea-Trans Limited
 Loyal Shipping Limited
 Ben Loyd Shipping Line Limited 
 Mohammadi Sea Ways Limited
 Mohammadi Stock Market Limited
 Mohammadi Developers Limited
 Mohammadi Homes Limited
 Mohammadi Air Travels Limited
 TimeNow Limited
 Mohammadi Trade International
 Mohammadi Shipping Limited
 Mohammadi Lawyers Limited
 Mohammadi Farms Limited
 REBUS Media Limited

References 

1972 establishments in Bangladesh
Organisations based in Dhaka
Conglomerate companies of Bangladesh